The Global Public Policy Institute (GPPi) is a non-profit think tank based in Berlin. Established in 2003, the institute focuses on topics related to foreign policy and global governance.

Founding
GPPi opened its Berlin office in October 2003.

Programs and Partnerships
GPPi has partnered and been supported by a number of organizations, foundations and academic institutions for its programs and projects.

In the field of human rights and humanitarian action, GPPi focuses on issues such as humanitarian assistance, refugee protection, and human rights advocacy. The institute conducts research on these topics and works with organizations such as the United Nations and the International Committee of the Red Cross to promote effective policies and practices. 

The institute's Global Governance Futures - Multilateral Dialogues program has partnered with The Hertie School of Governance, Tsinghua University, Fudan University, The Tokyo Foundation, Keio University, Centre for Policy Research India, Ashoka University, The Brookings Institution and Woodrow Wilson School of Public and International Affairs. The program is supported by the Robert Bosch Stiftung.

The institute's Global Norm Evolution & Responsibility to Protect project focuses on research and debate related to the Responsibility to Protect. This project has partnered with Central European University, Fundação Getúlio Vargas, Jawaharlal Nehru University, University of Oxford, Peking University and Peace Research Institute Frankfurt. The project is supported by Volkswagen Foundation, Bank of Sweden Tercentenary Foundation and Compagnia di San Paolo.

See also
 German Institute for International and Security Affairs
 German Council on Foreign Relations
 German Marshall Fund

References

Foreign policy and strategy think tanks
Global policy organizations
Think tanks based in Germany